Haynes is a surname.

Etymology

According to the Oxford Dictionary of Family Names in Britain and Ireland, the modern names Haine, Hayne, Haines, Hains, Hanes, and Haynes all originate in four different medieval names, which came to sound the same.

 The Middle English name Hain. This is thought to have originated as a pet form of Anglo-Norman names such as Reynald, Reyner and Rainbert.
 The personal name Hagan, which is itself of diverse origins.
 The Old English word haga ('enclosure', Middle English hay), in the oblique case form hagan (Middle English hayne), whose use could have arisen from a locative epithet such as æt hagan ('at the enclosure').

The forms ending in -s show the addition of the genitive case ending, implying that the name-bearer was the child of a father called Hain, or addition of -s on the analogy of such named.

Additional etymologies for Haines and Haynes names not shared by the Hayne types are:
 the place-name of Haynes, Bedfordshire, indicating people from that village (whose name itself derived from Old English *hægen ('enclosures').
 the Irish name Hynes.

The Oxford Dictionary of Family Names in Britain and Ireland also considers the suggestion of origins in the Welsh name Einws (a pet form of Einion), but does not find evidence to support this.

Distribution

As of around 2011, 15,237 individuals had the surname Haynes in Great Britain, and 110 in Ireland. In 1881, 10446 people in Great Britain had the name, which was widespread in England, with a cluster in the Midlands. Meanwhile, Irish bearers of the name around the middle of the nineteenth century clustered in Cork.

People

Notable people with the surname include:

A–J
 Alex Haynes (born 1982), American football player
 Abner Haynes (born 1937), American football player
 Adrian Haynes (1926–1988), Native American leader
 Arden Haynes  (1927–2017), Canadian businessman and university administrator
 Arthur Haynes (1914–1966), English comedian
 Billy Jack Haynes (born 1953), American former professional wrestler
 Colton Haynes (born 1988), American actor
 Nelly (born Cornell Haynes Jr. in 1974), American rapper
 D. E. L. Haynes (1913–1994), English classical scholar, archaeologist and curator
 Danny Haynes (born 1988), English footballer
 Deborah Haynes, British journalist
 Desmond Haynes (born 1956), West Indian cricketer and cricket coach
 Dick Haynes (1911–1980), American actor
 Elizabeth Haynes (crime writer), British writer of crime fiction
 Elizabeth Ross Haynes (1883–1953), African American social worker, sociologist, and author
 Elizabeth Sterling Haynes (1897–1957), Canadian theatre activist
 Elwood Haynes (1857–1925), American inventor and co-founder of the Haynes-Apperson Company
 Euphemia Haynes (1890–1980), African American mathematician and educator
 Fred Haynes (c. 1952), Canadian politician 
 Gibby Haynes (born 1957), American musician
 Grace Lynne Haynes, American artist
 James Haynes (American football) (born 1960), American football player
 Jerry Haynes (1927–2011), American actor and children's television host
 Jimmy Haynes (born 1972), American baseball player
 Joe Haynes (baseball) (1917–1967), American baseball player
 Joe M. Haynes (1936–2018), American lawyer and politician
 John Haynes (governor) (1594–1654), English colonial magistrate, governor of the Massachusetts Bay Colony and Connecticut Colony
 John Henry Haynes (1849–1910), American archaeologist and pioneering early photographer
 John Earl Haynes (born 1944), American historian
 Johnny Haynes (1934–2005), English football player
 Jordan Haynes (born 1996), Canadian soccer player

L–Z
 Lemuel Haynes (1753–1833), American preacher and abolitionist
 Marquis Haynes (born 1993), American football player
 Martin Alonzo Haynes (1842–1919), US Representative
 Michael Haynes (defensive lineman)  (born 1980), American football player
 Michael Haynes III (born 1964), American professional wrestler better known as Prince Iaukea
 Michael E. Haynes (1927–2019), American Baptist minister and politician
 Mike Haynes (cornerback) (born 1953), American football player
 Mitzi Haynes (born 1915), American actress better known as Mitzi Gould
 Nicole Haynes (born 1974), Canadian-American heptathlete
 Phil Haynes (American football) (born 1995), American football player
 
 Robert Haynes (1931–1998), Canadian geneticist and biophysicist
 Roberta Haynes (born 1929), American actress
 Roy Haynes (born 1926), American jazz musician
 Stanley Haynes (producer) (1906–1958), British film producer and screenwriter
 Stephen Haynes (1801–1879), American politician, builder and businessman
 Susan Bunton Haynes, (born 1959), Episcopal Bishop
 Terrence Haynes (born 1984), Barbadian freestyle swimmer
 Todd Haynes (born 1961), American film director
 Trudy Haynes (1926-2022), American journalist
 Walter Battison Haynes (1859–1900), English pianist, organist and composer.
 Warren Haynes (born 1960), American rock and blues guitarist
 Williams Haynes (1886–1970), American journalist and historian

Fictional characters
Mr. Haynes, character in the novel Minty Alley by C. L. R. James
Gus Haynes, a character in the fifth season of The Wire

References

Sources
 

English-language surnames